Cheltenham railway station is located on the Main North line, serving the Sydney suburb of Cheltenham. It is served by Sydney Trains T9 Northern Line services.

History

Cheltenham station opened on 10 October 1898.
It was established mainly due to pressure from William Chorley, whose home was located near the station. Chorley prevented commercial development near the station by placing covenants on the surrounding land, which he owned, and so Cheltenham is one of the few stations in Sydney with no shops nearby.

As part of the original plans for the North West Rail Link it was proposed to upgrade Cheltenham station to four tracks as part of the quadruplication of the line between Epping and Beecroft. There were however no plans for North West Rail Line services to stop at Cheltenham station. Due to complaints by local residents about noise and increased train services, the proposal to route the line through Cheltenham was scrapped, in favour of a tunnel starting at Epping station from the Epping to Chatswood line.

However, a second northbound track was built through the station around a decade later as part of the North Sydney Freight Corridor project, with the western platform becoming an island. The works included the construction of a new concourse with lifts, which opened on 31 August 2015. The new platform opened on 14 June 2016.

Platforms and services
The station is served by four trains per hour each way, with additional trains during weekday peak hours. During off-peak hours two of these four train services towards Central terminate at Chatswood.

References

External links

Cheltenham station details Transport for New South Wales

Easy Access railway stations in Sydney
Railway stations in Sydney
Railway stations in Australia opened in 1898
Main North railway line, New South Wales